Hypocalymma scariosum is a member of the family Myrtaceae endemic to Western Australia.

It blooms in September producing cream flowers.

It is found along the south coast in swamps in the South West and Great Southern regions of Western Australia  where it grows in sandy soils.

References

scariosum
Endemic flora of Western Australia
Rosids of Western Australia
Plants described in 1844